Nights of Zayandeh Rood is an Iranian film written and directed by Mohsen Makhmalbaf. It was released, censored and banned in 1990-1991, it wasn't shown for 26 years until 2016 Venice Film Festival. It is named after the Zayande Rood river in Isfahan, Iran.

37 Minutes of the film was censored.

Plot 
The story is about the life of a sociology university lecturer and his daughter pre 1979 revolution, during the revolution and after it.

Cast 

 Manochehr Esmaeeli
 Mozhgan Naderi
 Parvaneh Gowharani
 Zeinab Rahdari
 Mehrdad Farid
 Mohsen Ghasemi
 Afsaneh Heidariyan
 Nahid Rashidi
 Maryam Naghib

Soundtrack 
Two of the songs used in the film are one song by Hossein Khajeh Amiri and one song by Alireza Eftekhari.

Awards 

 9th Fajr Film Festival nominated for best screenplay and sound capture

References 
Films directed by Mohsen Makhmalbaf
Iranian drama films
1990 films